Roger Manning may refer to:

Roger Manning, American anti-folk singer
Roger Joseph Manning, Jr. (born 1966), keyboardist
Roger Manning, a fictional character of Tom Corbett, Space Cadet, played by actor Jan Merlin in the TV series